Christian Aebli (born July 1, 1978) is a Swiss bobsledder who has competed since 1998. He finished eighth in the four-man event at the 2006 Winter Olympics in Turin.

Aebli also competed at the FIBT World Championships, earning his best finish of sixth in the four-man event at Calgary in 2005.

Aebli was born in Seewis in the Prättigau Valley, near Davos.

References
 FIBT profile
 FIBT World Championships 2007 four-man results
 

1978 births
Bobsledders at the 2006 Winter Olympics
Living people
Olympic bobsledders of Switzerland
Swiss male bobsledders